Juan Laso de la Vega (died December 1516) was a Roman Catholic prelate who served as Auxiliary Bishop of Seville (1506–1516).

Biography
Juan Laso de la Vega was ordained a priest in the Order of Saint Augustine. In 1506, he was appointed during the papacy of Pope Julius II as Auxiliary Bishop of Seville and Titular Bishop of Philadelphia in Arabia. He was consecrated bishop in the same year. He served as Auxiliary Bishop of Seville until his death in Dec 1516.

References

External links and additional sources
 (for Chronology of Bishops) 
 (for Chronology of Bishops) 

16th-century Roman Catholic bishops in Spain
1516 deaths
Bishops appointed by Pope Julius II
Augustinian bishops